The Felsberg is a hill in the Odenwald range in Hesse, Germany.

Hills of Hesse

Impressions